Micropterocerus is a genus of picture-winged flies in the family Ulidiidae.

Species
 M. longifacies

References

Ulidiidae